The 1967 Cork Junior Hurling Championship was the 70th staging of the Cork Junior Hurling Championship since its establishment by the Cork County Board. 

The final was played on 26 November 1967 at the Athletic Grounds in Cork, between Kilworth and Cloughduv, in what was their first ever meeting in the final. Kilworth won the match by 3-11 to 2-07 to claim their first ever championship.

Kilworth's Fred Sheedy was the championship's top scorer with 2-10.

Qualification

Results

Quarter-finals

 Cloughduv received a bye in this round.

Semi-finals

Final

Championship statistics

Top scorers

Overall

In a single game

References

Cork Junior Hurling Championship
Cork Junior Hurling Championship